Aassoun     is a Lebanese village, located in the Miniyeh-Danniyeh District. It had 2,142 eligible voters in the 2009 elections, and the residents were Sunni Muslim and Greek Orthodox.

History
In 1838, Eli Smith noted  the village as 'Asum,  located in the Ed-Dunniyeh area. The inhabitants were   Sunni Muslim and Greek Orthodox  Christians.

References

Bibliography

External links
Aassoun, Localiban

Populated places in Miniyeh-Danniyeh District
Populated places in Lebanon
Eastern Orthodox Christian communities in Lebanon
Sunni Muslim communities in Lebanon